Syria competed at the 1980 Summer Olympics in Moscow, USSR. The country returned to the Olympic Games after missing the 1976 Summer Olympics in Montreal.

Competitors
The following is the list of number of competitors in the Games.

Athletics

Men
Track events

Field events

Women
Track events

Field events

Boxing

Men

Football

First round

Group C

Judo

Men

Shooting

Open

Weightlifting

Men

Wrestling

References
Official Olympic Reports
sports-reference
Olympedia

Nations at the 1980 Summer Olympics
1980
Olympics, Summer